Sufetula alychnopa is a moth in the family Crambidae. It was described by Turner in 1908. It is found in Australia, where it has been recorded from Queensland.

The wingspan is about 20 mm.

References

Moths described in 1908
Spilomelinae
Taxa named by Alfred Jefferis Turner